"I Will Be Your Friend" may refer to:

"I Will Be Your Friend", song by Sade from Diamond Life 1984
"I Will Be Your Friend", song by Clarence Gatemouth Brown from No Looking Back 1992	
"I Will Be Your Friend", song by Amy Grant from Behind the Eyes 1997
"I Will Be Your Friend", song by Michael W. Smith from This Is Your Time  1999